Havok is a middleware software suite developed by the Irish company Havok. Havok provides a physics engine component and related functions to video games.

In September 2007, Intel announced it had signed a definitive agreement to acquire Havok Inc. In 2008, Havok was honored at the 59th Annual Technology & Engineering Emmy Awards for advancing the development of physics engines in electronic entertainment. In October 2015, Microsoft announced it had acquired Havok.

Products
The Havok middleware suite consists of the following modules:

 Havok Physics: It is designed primarily for video games, and allows for real-time collision and dynamics of rigid bodies in three dimensions. It provides multiple types of dynamic constraints between rigid bodies (e.g. for ragdoll physics), and has a highly optimized collision detection library. By using dynamical simulation, Havok Physics allows for more realistic virtual worlds in games. The company was developing a specialized version of Havok Physics called Havok FX that made use of ATI and NVIDIA GPUs for physics simulations; however, the goal of GPU acceleration did not materialize until several years later.
Havok AI: In 2009, Havok released Havok AI, which provides advanced pathfinding capabilities for games. Havok AI provides navigation mesh generation, pathfinding and path following for video game environments.
 Havok Cloth: Released in 2008, Havok Cloth deals with efficient simulation of character garments and soft body dynamics.
 Havok Destruction (discontinued): Also released in 2008, Havok Destruction provides tools for creation of destructible and deformable rigid body environments.
Havok Animation Studio (discontinued): Havok Animation Studio is formally known as Havok Behavior and Havok Animation. Havok Behavior is a runtime SDK for controlling game character animation at a high level using finite state machines. Havok Animation provides efficient playback and compression of character animations in games, and features such as inverse kinematics.
 Havok Script (discontinued): Havok Script is a Lua-compatible virtual machine designed for video game development. It is shipped as part of the Havok Script Studio.
 Havok Vision Engine (discontinued): On August 8, 2011, Havok announced their acquisition of German game engine development company Trinigy and their Vision Engine and toolset.

Platforms
Version 1.0 of the Havok SDK was unveiled at the Game Developers Conference (GDC) in 2000. The Havok SDK is multi-platform by nature and is always updated to run on the majority of the latest platforms. Licensees are given access to most of the C/C++ source-code, giving them the freedom to customize the engine's features, or port it to different platforms although some libraries are only provided in binary format. In March 2011, Havok showed off a version of the Havok physics engine designed for use with the Sony Xperia Play, or more specifically, Android 2.3. During Microsoft's //BUILD/ 2012 conference, Havok unveiled a full technology suite for Windows 8, Windows RT , Windows Phone 8 and later Windows 10.

Usage

Video games
Since the SDK's launch in 2000, it has been used in over 600 video games.

Other software
Havok can also be found in:
Futuremark's 3DMark2001 and 03 benchmarking tools
a plug-in for Maya animation software
Valve's Source game engine uses VPhysics, which is a physics engine modified from Havok

Havok supplies tools (the "Havok Content Tools") for export of assets for use with all Havok products from Autodesk 3ds Max, Autodesk Maya, and (formerly) Autodesk Softimage. Havok was also used in the virtual world Second Life, with all physics handled by its online simulator servers, rather than by the users' client computers. An upgrade to Havok version 4 was released in April 2008 and an upgrade to version 7 started June, 2010.
Second Life resident Emilin Nakamori constructed a weight-driven, pendulum-regulated mechanical clock functioning entirely by Havok Physics in March 2019.

References

2000 software
Computer physics engines
Microsoft software
Middleware for video games
Video game development software
Video game engines
Virtual reality